The Fredonia Blue Devils (also known as the SUNY Fredonia Blue Devils or the Fredonia State Blue Devils) are composed of 16 teams representing the State University of New York at Fredonia in intercollegiate athletics, including men and women's basketball, cross country, soccer, swimming & diving, and track and field. Men's sports include baseball and ice hockey. Women's sports include lacrosse, softball, tennis, and volleyball. The Blue Devils compete in the NCAA Division III and are members of the State University of New York Athletic Conference.

Teams

Baseball
Fredonia has had 3 Major League Baseball Draft selection since the draft began in 1965.

Athletic facilities
Named athletic facilities include:
Ludwig Field, baseball field
Steele Hall, or "Steele Hall Ice Arena", new in 2013, is "in use nearly 18 hours a day during hockey season from September through March", serving Fredonia State collegiate hockey, the Fredonia State Club Hockey team as well as the Dunkirk-Fredonia Steelers.

References

External links